The British Association of Paediatric Surgeons (BAPS) is a registered charity that aims to advance the study and practice of paediatric surgery.

The organisation
The organisation was founded in 1953. The idea for the group came up when a group of four British surgeons - Denis Browne, Robert Zachary, David Waterston and Peter Rickham - attended a meeting of the American Academy of Pediatrics the year before. At the time, there were only a few dozen known paediatric surgeons across the world, so they were all invited to join BAPS.

Founding members
Denis Browne (surgeon), Great Ormond Street Hospital in London
Valentine Swain, Queen Elizabeth Hospital for Children in Hackney.
JJ Mason Browne, Royal Hospital for Sick Children, Glasgow
Wallace Denison, RHSC, Glasgow
Isabella Forshall, Alder Hey Children's Hospital, Liverpool
Peter Paul Rickham, Alder Hey Children's Hospital, Liverpool
Robert Zachary, Sheffield
Ambrose Jolleys, Manchester
John Scott, Newcastle
David Waterston

Affiliations
BAPS is one of several national paediatric surgical organisations affiliated with the Journal of Pediatric Surgery. The organisation awards the Denis Browne Gold Medal to recognize outstanding achievement in the field. The award is named for Sir Denis Browne, the first president of the association. The first award, given in 1968, went to surgeon Robert Edward Gross.

References

1953 establishments in England
Pediatric surgery
Professional associations based in the United Kingdom
Surgical organisations based in the United Kingdom